The Jardin botanique du Montet (27 hectares), sometimes also called the Jardin botanique de Nancy, is a major botanical garden operated by the Conservatoire et Jardins Botaniques de Nancy. It is located at 100, rue du Jardin Botanique, Villers-lès-Nancy, Meurthe-et-Moselle, Lorraine, France, and open daily; free entrance but an admission fee is charged to visit the greenhouses.

The garden was inaugurated in 1975 as successor to the city's earliest botanical garden, the Jardin Dominique Alexandre Godron (founded 1758), whose plants were transferred to the new garden in 1993. Today the garden contains more than 12,000 types of plants, organized into 15 collections by themes, including sections devoted to the plants of Lorraine, an arboretum, alpine garden, medicinal plants, rhododendrons, rose garden, and so forth, over 35 hectares (i.e. circa 86 acres). Its greenhouses (2500 m²) contain humid and arid rooms sheltering a variety of plants including rare species such as Miconia ascendens and Rubus alceaefolius.

Gallery

See also 
 Jardin d'altitude du Haut Chitelet
 List of botanical gardens in France

References 
 Jardin botanique du Montet
 Map, photographs, information (French)
 250 Ans d'Histoire des Jardins botaniques de Nancy (French)
 Un peu d'histoire ou l'origine de la botanique à Nancy (French)
 Conservatoire des Jardins and Paysages entry (French)
 Gralon entry (French)

Montet, Jardin botanique du
Montet, Jardin botanique du